William Paterson Templeton (8 November 1876 – 4 July 1938) was a Scottish Unionist Party politician.

He contested Ross and Cromarty in 1911 and sat as Member of Parliament for Banffshire from 1924 until 1929. He was unsuccessful in Glasgow Shettleston at a 1930 by-election, and sat for Coatbridge from 1931 until 1935.

Sources
 Who Was Who

External links 
 

1876 births
1938 deaths
Unionist Party (Scotland) MPs
UK MPs 1924–1929
UK MPs 1931–1935
Liberal Unionist Party parliamentary candidates